SS Mission Santa Ynez was a Type T2-SE-A2 tanker built for the United States Maritime Commission during World War II. After the war she was acquired by the United States Navy as USS Mission Santa Ynez (AO-134). Later the tanker transferred to the Military Sea Transportation Service as USNS Mission Santa Ynez (T-AO-134). A , she was named for Mission Santa Inés located in Solvang, California.

The Mission Santa Ynez, the last T-2 tanker in existence, was stored at Suisun Bay as part of the Suisun Bay Reserve Fleet from 1975 until April 2010 when a lawsuit forced the U.S. Maritime Administration (MARAD) to remove her. The tanker was transported to a ship recycling facility in Brownsville, Texas via the Panama Canal in May 2010 for scrapping by Esco Marine.

Career 
Mission Santa Ynez was laid down 9 September 1943 under a Maritime Commission contract by Marinship Corporation, Sausalito, California; launched 19 December 1943; sponsored by Mrs. Ralph K. Davies; and delivered 13 March 1944. Chartered to Pacific Tankers, Inc., for operations, she spent the remainder of the War carrying fuel to our forces overseas. She remained in this capacity until 28 March 1946 when she was returned to the Maritime Commission and laid up in the Maritime reserve Fleet at James River, Virginia.

Acquired by the Navy 22 October 1947 she was placed in service with the Naval Transportation Service as Mission Santa Ynez (AO-134). Taken over by the newly created Military Sea Transportation Service 1 October 1949 she was redesignated USNS Mission Santa Ynez (T-AO-134). Chartered to Mathiasens Tanker Industries, Inc., for operations, she entered the Maritime Administration's Suisun Bay Reserve Fleet on 6 March 1975. She was the last T-2 tanker extant. Towed from the Maritime reserve Fleet at Suisun Bay, California on March 31, 2010, headed for dismantling in Texas via the Panama Canal.

During her active duty, she was awarded the National Defense Service Medal (twice), the Korean Service Medal, the United Nations Service Medal and the Republic of Korea War Service Medal (retroactively).

References

  
 

Property Management and Archive Record System Website

External links

 

Type T2-SE-A2 tankers
Ships built in Sausalito, California
1943 ships
World War II tankers of the United States
Santa Ynez
Type T2-SE-A2 tankers of the United States Navy
Historic American Engineering Record in California